Walnut Creek is a stream in Randolph County in the U.S. state of Missouri. It is a tributary to the East Fork Little Chariton River.

Walnut Creek was so named due to the presence of walnut trees in the area.

See also
List of rivers of Missouri

References

Rivers of Randolph County, Missouri
Rivers of Missouri